Anthony Ray Barker (born September 7, 1968) is a former American football linebacker in the National Football League (NFL).  He played college football at the University of Kansas before transferring to Rice University following his sophomore year. He was drafted by the Washington Redskins in the 10th round, 280th overall selection, of the 1992 NFL Draft. He also briefly played for the Green Bay Packers.

High school career
Barker began attending Wichita Northwest High School in Wichita in 1984.  While at Northwest, he participated in football, basketball, and shot put/discus in track and field.  However, he gave up basketball after his junior year. As a high school football player, he played offensive tackle, defensive end and punter. In his senior year, he was a 1st Team All-City selection as an offensive tackle, defensive end, and punter, best 11 in the state from Wichita and Topeka newspapers, and honorable mention in the 1986 High School All-American football team voting.

Barker was voted to the Wichita Eagle's all-time Wichita High School Football team as a 1st team offensive tackle. Also on that team was former Detroit Lions Defensive end Lawrence Pete (who went to South), Linebackers Mark (Seattle Seahawks/Indianapolis Colts) and Mike Bell (Kansas City Chiefs) (Both went to Bishop Carroll), Pro-Football Hall of fame running back Barry Sanders (North), and Tennessee Titans Linebacker Kamerion Wimbley, who is (like Barker) a Northwest alumni.

College career
Barker was recruited by multiple Division I programs. Barker's final selection came down to Kansas and Oklahoma State and with encouragement from his parents, he picked Kansas. He was recruited as a defensive end, but while watching film of another recruit, his coaches noticed his speed and decided to switch him to linebacker.

After the 1987 season, head coach Bob Valesente left and Glen Mason took over. Because of the coaching change, Barker transferred to Rice after his sophomore season. By NCAA regulations he had to be redshirted his junior year. He lettered in football in 1990 and 1991. In 1991, he collected 127 tackles, tied for the fifth highest single-season total in team history. That same year, he finished with five interceptions, eighth on the team single-season list. He made the All-Southwest Conference that year and won the Jess Neely Linebacker Award.

College statistics

Professional career

NFL Draft
After the NFL combine, the Cincinnati Bengals and Oakland Raiders expressed interest in Barker. Ultimately, he was drafted by the Washington Redskins in the 10th round (280th overall pick) in the 1992 NFL draft.

Washington Redskins
He signed a 1-year contract worth $110,000, the league minimum at the time, a common occurrence for late-round picks. Barker was released during the preseason, but was eventually re-signed. He also spent a portion of the 1992 season on the Redskins practice squad.  As a rookie, he mainly played on special teams, but had two starts at outside linebacker against the Kansas City Chiefs and the Seattle Seahawks. After the season, Barker's contract expired and Joe Gibbs retired. Following Gibbs's retirement, Richie Petitbon took over and chose not to renew Barker's contract.

Green Bay Packers
Barker was reunited with the coach that recruited him at Kansas, Bob Valesente, when the Green Bay Packers signed him before their 1994 training camp. He was released two days before the first pre-season game.

Retirement
Barker decided not continue his career, despite several offers from minor league teams and the Scottish Claymores of NFL Europa (then, NFL Europe). He finished his NFL career recording no official statistics, due in part to tackles not being officially recorded until 2001, and eight games played with two starts.

Personal life
Barker resides in Texas. He works at Colonial National Mortgage as a Senior Mortgage Loan Officer. He married his wife in March 2005. He has two children, from a previous marriage and two stepchildren from his wife's previous marriage.

References

1968 births
Living people
American football linebackers
Rice Owls football players
Washington Redskins players
Players of American football from Wichita, Kansas
Kansas Jayhawks football players